A general election was held in the U.S. state of North Carolina on November 3, 2020. 

To vote by mail, registered North Carolina voters had to request a ballot by October 27, 2020. As of early October, some 1,268,014 voters requested mail ballots.

Federal offices

President of the United States 

North Carolina has 15 electoral votes in the Electoral College. Nominees for the presidential election included Donald Trump (R), Joe Biden (D), and Jo Jorgensen (L), with incumbent president Trump winning the state's electors.

United States Senate 

Thom Tillis (R, incumbent), Cal Cunningham (D), Kevin E. Hayes (C), and Shannon Bray (L) ran for office in the general election of North Carolina, with incumbent Tillis winning a second term.

United States House of Representatives 

North Carolina voted for 13 U.S. Representatives, one from each of the state's 13 congressional districts.

State offices

Executive offices

North Carolina is one of 11 states that held elections for governor in the 2020 general election. Roy Cooper (D, incumbent) ran against Dan Forest (R), Al Pisano (C), Steven DiFiore II (L), and won a second term. 

Other executive offices up for election in the general election included Lieutenant Governor, Attorney General, Secretary of State, Treasurer, Superintendent of Public Instruction, Auditor, Commissioner of Agriculture, Commissioner of Labor, and Commissioner of Insurance.

Judicial elections

Legislature
The outcome of this election affected partisan balance during post-census redistricting.

State Senate

All 50 seats within the North Carolina Senate were up for election in the general election, with the Democrats making a net gain of 1.

State House of Representatives

All 120 seats within the state's House of Representatives were up for election in the general election, with the Republicans making a 4-seat net gain but still falling short of a "veto-proof" 3/5 supermajority.

North Carolina ballot measures 
There were no statewide ballot measures on the ballot in the general election; however, there were local measures for voters in Guilford County, Mecklenburg County, and Wake County.

See also
 Electoral reform in North Carolina
 North Carolina State Board of Elections
 Political party strength in North Carolina
 Politics of North Carolina
 Elections in North Carolina

References

Further reading

External links

 
 . (Lawsuit about electronic voting system, "ExpressVote", a product of Election Systems & Software, LLC)

 
 
 
  (State affiliate of the U.S. League of Women Voters)
 
 . (Guidance to help voters get to the polls; addresses transport, childcare, work, information challenges)

 
North Carolina
North Carolina elections by year